Chile–China relations are foreign relations between the Republic of Chile and the People's Republic of China. Diplomatic relation were established in 1915.
 Both nations are members of the Asia-Pacific Economic Cooperation and the United Nations.

History 
The relations between the People's Republic of China and Chile began on 15 December 1970, shortly following the election of Salvador Allende, and Chile became the first South American country to recognize the mainland Chinese government. Following the 1973 Chilean coup d'état which saw the overthrow of the Allende government, China was one of only two Communist countries (the other was Romania) not to have severed ties with Augusto Pinochet's new regime, due to the latter's continued endorsement of the One China Policy. As a result, China chose not to recall its ambassador in Chile, while replacing the Allende appointed ambassador Armando Uribe with a Pinochet appointed one. China also chose to represent the affairs of Chile in the DPRK and the affairs of the DPRK in Chile.

The continued relationship was built on pragmatism and non-interference. China supported Chile's claim of sovereignty over Antarctic, and in turn, Chile allowed the Chinese to build the Great Wall research station inside Chile's territorial claims. There was also a failed attempt at a joint venture to produce weapons between Norinco and FAMAE, aimed at reducing Chile's military dependence on the United States. Pinochet has nurtured his relationship with China. Pinochet visited China in 1993 and 1997.

Following the end of the Cold War and fall of the Pinochet regime in 1990, bilateral relations continued, with the new Chilean government pursuing a policy of free trade, and supported China's entrance into the World Trade Organization.

Bilateral relations 
Chile is one of the first Latin American countries which began trade and economic exchanges with China after the Chinese civil war. Bilateral trade between the two countries began as early as 1961 when China established the Commercial News Office of Chinese Import and Export Corporation. In 1965 was re-established as the Commercial Office of China Council for the Promotion of International Trade.

Since the establishment of the diplomatic relations in 1970, bilateral economic relations have developed considerably. Chile became China's third largest Latin American trading partner behind Brazil and Mexico. Bilateral trade volume set a record at $2.565 billion in 2002.

Chinese exports to Chile is primary in textiles, clothing, ceramics, chemicals and medicine, tools and consumer electronics.

Chilean exports to China are mainly in copper, niter, pulp, paper, fish meal and timber. This has also expanded to red wine, marine alga, potassium sulphate and fruit produce.

Chile and China have signed a Free Trade Agreement in 2006.

In 2009, bilateral trade reached US$17.4 billion. Chilean export amounted to 23 percent of Chile's total exports.

Current relations 

In the past couple of years, there has been a large influx of Chinese workers, primarily businessmen, into Chile. Having one of the older trading relationships of South America with China, Chile is extending its trade into that of human capital. Chile has welcomed China's educated workers into every sector of operations, especially in the agriculture and minerals extraction industries.

Hoping to tap into one of Latin America's best performing and vast countries (aside from Argentina and Uruguay), Chinese workers are taking this opportunities as a chance to create a food source for their country. As Chile has a great amount of fertile land, great for crops and livestock, the Chinese are looking to arrange deals with the country to have sanctions of free land for the sole purpose of making produce to export to China.

No official deals have made as of yet, but the Chinese have been purchasing Chilean land, along with land in other countries, for years, with the purpose of growing their food production.

Chinese company purchased controlling stake in Sociedad Química y Minera, It is Chile lithium producer and world's biggest lithium producer.

Resident diplomatic missions
 Chile has an embassy in Beijing and consulates-general in Chengdu, Guangzhou, Hong Kong and Shanghai.
 China has an embassy in Santiago and a consulate-general in Iquique.

See also 
Foreign relations
Foreign policy

References

External links 
Chinese Embassy in Chile 
Chilean Embassy in Beijing, China  
Chile and China: Building Relations Beyond Trade?

 
Bilateral relations of China
China